John Williams (born 23 April 1931) is a New Zealand former cricketer. He played three first-class matches for Canterbury in 1952/53.

See also
 List of Canterbury representative cricketers

References

External links
 

1931 births
Living people
New Zealand cricketers
Canterbury cricketers
Sportspeople from Canterbury